Kfar Beit (also known as كفر بيت, Kfar Beït, Kafr Bayt or Kfarbeet) is a Lebanese village in the south of Lebanon. It is close to the city of Saida. Kfar Beit has an average elevation of 374 meters or 1,227 feet.

The closest airport is the Rafic Hariri International Airport

References

External links
Official Website
Lebanese Laws (in Arabic)
  Kfar Beit, Localiban 

Populated places in Sidon District